Glendale Colony may refer to:

 Glendale Colony, Montana
 Glendale Colony, South Dakota